The South Carolina Lowcountry National Wildlife Refuge Complex is an administrative organization that manages U.S. Fish and Wildlife Service wildlife refuges in eastern South Carolina. The complex includes:

 Cape Romain National Wildlife Refuge
 Waccamaw National Wildlife Refuge
 Mackay Island National Wildlife Refuge
 Santee National Wildlife Refuge
 Ernest F. Hollings ACE Basin National Wildlife Refuge

The complex headquarters and visitor center is in the Alligator River refuge headquarters on Roanoke Island.

References

External links
South Carolina Lowcountry National Wildlife Refuges Complex page

National Wildlife Refuges in South Carolina
Protected areas of Charleston County, South Carolina
Protected areas of Chesterfield County, South Carolina
Protected areas of Beaufort County, South Carolina
Protected areas of Clarendon County, South Carolina